Ahmad Abu Al-Soud (born 5 July 1995) is a Jordanian artistic gymnast. He became the first gymnast from Jordan to medal at the World Artistic Gymnastics Championships when he won the silver medal on pommel horse at the 2022 World Championships.

Career 
Abu Al Soud began gymnastics when he was four years old.

At the 2022 World Championships in Liverpool, Abu Al Soud qualified for the pommel horse event final in eighth place, becoming the first gymnast from Jordan to qualify for an event final at the World Artistic Gymnastics Championships. He then won the silver medal in the pommel horse final behind Irish gymnast Rhys McClenaghan. This marked the first time a gymnast from Jordan and the first time an Arab gymnast had won a medal at the World Championships.

References 

1995 births
Living people
Jordanian male artistic gymnasts
Medalists at the World Artistic Gymnastics Championships